Yevgeny Kafelnikov was the defending champion and won in the final 7–6(7–2), 6–4 against Byron Black.

Seeds

Draw

Finals

Top half

Bottom half

External links
 Draw

Kremlin Cup
Kremlin Cup